East African Business Week is a weekly Ugandan newspaper published in Kampala, Uganda's capital and largest city. It is the only exclusively business weekly published in the country.

Location
The coordinates of the newspaper headquarters are 0°20'17.0"N, 32°35'05.0"E (Latitude:0.338053; Longitude:2.584730).

Overview
EABW maintains five bureaus, one in each of the five East African cities of Kampala, Nairobi, Kigali, Bujumbura, and Dar es Salaam. The newspaper covers investment and business news, together with health and technology news in Burundi, Kenya, Rwanda, Tanzania, and Uganda. It is published in English only. It has print and Internet versions.

History
The paper was founded in 2005. It is published by East Africa Business Weekly Limited.

See also
 List of newspapers in Uganda
 Media in Uganda

References

External links
  Website of East African Business Week

Weekly newspapers published in Uganda
Mass media in Kampala
Newspapers established in 2005
2005 establishments in Uganda